Ringo's Rotogravure is the fifth studio album by Ringo Starr, released in 1976. It was the last project to feature active involvement from all four former Beatles before John Lennon's murder in 1980, and the second of two projects following the band's 1970 breakup to hold the distinction (alongside Ringo from 1973). Following the end of his contract with EMI, Starr signed on with Polydor Records worldwide (Atlantic Records handling US distribution).

Background and recording
It was reported in December 1975 that ABC Records in the US was to sign former Beatle Ringo Starr for a 5-year recording contract, worth $5 million. However, on 26 January 1976, when Starr's recording contract with EMI ended, he signed with Atlantic for the US and Polydor for the UK, on 10 March. As stated in the deal, Starr was expected to release 7 albums within 5 years, with the first album planned for release in June. Starr's original intention was to get Richard Perry to produce the album, before he had switched labels. Starr thought "since we were trying another label, we'd try another producer." It had been suggested by Atlantic to Starr that he work with Arif Mardin, who was the in-house producer for the label at the time. Mardin met up with Starr in London to see what they were like together and, pleased with the encounter, Mardin told Starr he would be happy to work with him. Starr's intention was to work in Los Angeles as his friends were there.

Starr again stuck to his proven formula of having friends write songs and perform on the recordings. This time, Eric Clapton took part, in addition to his old friend Harry Nilsson, and Peter Frampton, Melissa Manchester, Dr. John, and former Beatles John Lennon, Paul McCartney and George Harrison. Sessions began in April at Sunset Sound Recorders in Los Angeles, and eventually moved on 12 June to Cherokee Recording Studios. Starr was joined at this session by Lennon and his wife Yoko Ono, recording the Lennon-penned "Cookin' (In the Kitchen of Love)". Lennon played the piano lines that are heard at the beginning of the song, in what was his only known studio recording during his five years of musical retreat that he kept until 1980.
 
McCartney, while on break from his Wings Over America tour with Wings, made the backing track to "Pure Gold" along with his wife Linda McCartney, which McCartney got Starr to sing over, on 19 June. Harrison donated a song too, but because of his commitments to get his album Thirty Three & 1/3 (1976) done on schedule, he was unable to partake in any recording for Ringo's Rotogravure. Harrison's contribution was a song previously known as "When Every Song Is Sung", which he had attempted to record first with Ronnie Spector in 1971, then with Cilla Black (on which Starr also played), and later still with Leon Russell's wife Mary. Eric Clapton played guitar on the track "This Be Called a Song". Several unreleased tracks were recorded during the sessions: "Where Are You Going", "All Right", "It's Hard to Be Lovers" and a track Starr co-wrote with Nilsson, "Party".

Music and lyrics
"Pure Gold", composed by Paul McCartney, had been influenced by Starr's then-girlfriend Nancy Andrews. "Cookin' (In the Kitchen of Love)" was written specifically for Starr by John Lennon. "Las Brisas", a track co-written between Starr and Andrews in Mexico, features Mariachi Los Galleros de Pedro Rey  with Starr on maracas. Starr claimed that he had "looked around all these Mexican restaurants and found this band who were sensational." "Lady Gaye" was based on Clifford T. Ward's "Birmingham" (from Ward's 1975 album No More Rock 'N' Roll), which in turn gave him co-credit on the Starkey–Poncia composition. "Spooky Weirdness" is an ad-libbed piece that closes the album.

Release

Ringo's Rotogravure was released on 17 September 1976 in the UK, to a lukewarm response. Despite letting him record the song, Harrison was not pleased with Starr's version of "I'll Still Love You", and proceeded to take legal action against Starr, which was soon settled out of court. The album's title came from the film Easter Parade (1948). At the time living as a UK tax exile, Starr promoted the album with interviews in Denmark, France and Italy. The album was packaged with a free magnifying glass so that those who bought the album could read the graffiti that was featured on the album's back cover. The "A Dose of Rock 'n' Roll" single, backed with "Cryin'", on 20 September in the US, reaching number 26.

Released in the US on 27 September, the album performed poorly, only reaching number 28 in America and quickly falling off the charts, while it never even appeared in the UK charts. The promotional film for "You Don't Know Me at All" aired on Dutch TV, in the Netherlands, on the show Voor De Vuist Weg. On 15 October the "A Dose of Rock 'n' Roll" single was released in the UK. In between this and the next single, Starr recorded the track "I Can Hear You Calling" at Atlantic Studios on 15 October. The follow-up single, his cover of Bruce Channel's "Hey! Baby", backed with "Lady Gaye", was released on 22 November in the US and stalled at number 74. The single was released in the UK on 26 November. A single comprising "Las Brisas" and "Cryin'" was released in Mexico. Ringo's Rotogravure was issued on CD, on the same day as Ringo the 4th, on 16 August 1992, in the US by Atlantic.

Track listing

Personnel
 Ringo Starr – lead vocals, drums, percussion
 Peter Frampton – guitars
 Lon Van Eaton – guitars
 Eric Clapton – guitar on "This Be Called a Song"
 Danny Kortchmar – guitars
 John Lennon – piano on "Cookin' (In the Kitchen of Love)"
 Dr. John – keyboards
 Jane Getz – keyboards
 Jim Keltner – drums
 Klaus Voormann – bass
 Paul McCartney – backing vocals on "Pure Gold"
 Linda McCartney – backing vocals on "Pure Gold"
 Melissa Manchester – backing vocals
 Harry Nilsson – backing vocals
 David Lasley – backing vocals
Mariachi Los Galleros de Pedro Rey – instruments and backing vocals on "Las Brisas"

Charts

Weekly charts

References
Footnotes

Citations

Sources

External links

JPGR's Ringo's Rotogravure site

1976 albums
Ringo Starr albums
Polydor Records albums
Atlantic Records albums
Albums produced by Arif Mardin